Croton schiedeanus is a plant species native from Mexico to tropical South America.

C schiedeanus is known to contain the flavonol ayanin and cis-clerodane diterpenoids.

See also
 List of Croton species

References

schiedeanus
Flora of Mexico
Flora of Central America
Flora of South America